Withania somnifera, known commonly as ashwagandha or winter cherry, is an evergreen shrub in the Solanaceae or nightshade family that grows in India, the Middle East, and parts of Africa. Several other species in the genus Withania are morphologically similar.

The plant, particularly its root powder, has been used for centuries in traditional Indian medicine. Although used in herbalism and sold as a dietary supplement, there is insufficient scientific evidence that it is safe or effective for treating any health condition or disease.

Description 
Tomentose branches extend radially from a central stem. The flowers are small, green and bell-shaped. The ripe fruit is orange-red.

Etymology
The Latin species name  means "sleep-inducing".

Cultivation
Withania somnifera is cultivated in many of the drier regions of India. It is also found in Nepal, Sri Lanka, China, and Yemen. It prefers dry stony soil with sun to partial shade. To propagate it can be grown from seed in the early spring, or from greenwood cuttings in the later spring.

Diseases and pests
Withania somnifera is prone to several pests and diseases. Leaf spot disease caused by Alternaria alternata is the most prevalent disease, which occurs in a severe form in Punjab, Haryana, and Himachal Pradesh. A decline in the concentration of its secondary metabolites occurs by leaf spot disease. A treehopper feeds on the apical portions of the stem, making them rough and woody in appearance and brown in colour.

The carmine red spider mite (Tetranychus urticae) is the most prevalent pest of the plant in India. In recent years, this plant has been serving as a new reservoir host for an invasive mealybug species Phenacoccus solenopsis.

Phytochemistry

The main phytochemical constituents are withanolides – which are triterpene lactones – withaferin A, alkaloids, steroidal lactones, tropine, and cuscohygrine. Some 40 withanolides, 12 alkaloids, and numerous sitoindosides have been isolated. Withanolides are structurally similar to the ginsenosides of Panax ginseng, leading to a common name for W. somnifera, "Indian ginseng".

Adverse effects 
W. somnifera may cause adverse effects if taken alone or together with prescription drugs. Side effects may include diarrhea, headache, sedation, or nausea, and the product should not be used during pregnancy or breastfeeding.

Gallery

References

External links
 

somnifera
Flora of Nepal
Plants used in Ayurveda